(155140) 2005 UD (provisional designation 2005 UD) is an asteroid on an eccentric orbit, classified as a near-Earth object of the Apollo group. It was discovered on 22 October 2005, by the Catalina Sky Survey at the Catalina Station in Arizona, United States. 2005 UD is thought to be a possible fragment of 3200 Phaethon due to its similar orbit, although it is not dynamically associated with the Geminid meteor stream produced by Phaethon.

However, no activity from 2005 UD has been observed as of yet, though it has been suspected that it could be the inactive parent body of the Daytime Sextantids meteor shower. 2005 UD and Phaethon share a bluish surface color at visible wavelengths, but differ at near-infrared wavelengths where 2005 UD appears redder than Phaethon.

See also 
 Active asteroid
 , a suspected extinct comet and proposed parent body of the Quadrantids meteor shower

References

External links 
 Exploring Links Between Nearby Asteroids, Susanna Kohler, AAS Nova, 19 June 2020
 
 

155140
Minor planet object articles (numbered)
155140
155140
155140
155140
155140
155140
20180928
20051022